Cass Township is one of twelve townships in Dubois County, Indiana. As of the 2010 census, its population was 2,115 and it contained 873 housing units.

History
Cass Township was created from land given by Patoka Township.

Geography

Cities and towns
 Holland

Unincorporated towns
 Johnsburg
 Saint Henry
 Zoar
(This list is based on USGS data and may include former settlements.)

Adjacent townships
 Patoka Township (north)
 Ferdinand Township (east)
 Carter Township, Spencer County (southeast)
 Pigeon Township, Warrick County (southwest)
 Lockhart Township, Pike County (west)

Major highways
  U.S. Route 231
  Indiana State Road 161

Cemeteries
The township contains eleven cemeteries: Augustana, Holland Methodist, Mount Vernon, Mount Zion, Saint Henry, Saint James (East and West), Saint Paul United Church of Christ, Stone Family Cemetery, Wibbeler Family Cemetery, Zoar Methodist (partially in Pike County).

References
 
 United States Census Bureau cartographic boundary files

External links
 Indiana Township Association
 United Township Association of Indiana

Townships in Dubois County, Indiana
Jasper, Indiana micropolitan area
Townships in Indiana